GrassMaster is a hybrid grass sports playing field surface composed of natural grass combined with artificial fibres. The method was developed and patented by Desso Sports from the Netherlands in 1993. This hybrid grass system is now marketed and further developed by Tarkett Sports after a takeover of Desso Sports and has been rebranded since as GrassMaster.

Technology 

GrassMaster reinforces a natural grass pitch by vertically inserting 20 million polypropylene (PP) fibers into the soil equally spread over the entire playing field. The grass roots entwine with the fibers and grow deeper and wider. The PP fibers above the surface are designed to ensure an even and stable surface. GrassMaster may be installed before seeding, after seeding or on grass sods.

Major installations

References

External links 
GrassMaster website

Association football equipment
Lawn grasses
Sports technology